Julian Knowle and Michael Kohlmann were the defending champions, but decided not to participate.
Lukáš Dlouhý and Michal Mertiňák won the title, defeating Philipp Marx and Florin Mergea 5–7, 7–5, [10–7] in the final.

Seeds

Draw

Draw

References
 Main Draw

Zucchetti Kos Tennis Cup - Doubles
2012 Doubles
Zucchetti